William Theophilus Bonniwell Jr. (1836–1889) was a member of the Wisconsin State Assembly, the Minnesota Senate and the Minnesota House of Representatives.

Biography
Bonniwell was born on August 10, 1836 in New York City. He moved with his parents to Milwaukee County, Wisconsin in 1839. From 1850 to 1852, he took part in the California Gold Rush. In 1866, he moved to Hutchinson, Minnesota.

Bonniwell's son, H. H. Bonniwell, also served in the Senate.

Political career
Bonniwell was a member of the Assembly from 1864 to 1865. He was later a member of the Senate in 1871 and again from 1878 to 1882 and of the House of Representatives in 1877. A Democrat, Bonniwell was affiliated with the War Democrats during his tenure in the Assembly.

References

1836 births
1899 deaths
Politicians from New York City
People from Milwaukee County, Wisconsin
People from Hutchinson, Minnesota
Democratic Party Minnesota state senators
Democratic Party members of the Minnesota House of Representatives
19th-century American politicians
Democratic Party members of the Wisconsin State Assembly